Anna Ponomaryova (23 February 1920 – 2009) was a Soviet fencer. She competed in the women's individual foil event at the 1952 Summer Olympics.

References

External links
 

1920 births
2009 deaths
Soviet female foil fencers
Olympic fencers of the Soviet Union
Fencers at the 1952 Summer Olympics